Marine Corps Installations East (MCIEAST) is the regional authority tasked with providing support and oversight of seven United States Marine Corps installations on the East Coast.

Mission

Implement policies, develop regional strategies and plans, prioritizes resources and provides services, direction, and oversight through assigned U.S. Marine Corps Installations in order to support the Operating Forces, tenant commands and activities.

Subordinate commands

 Marine Corps Logistics Base Albany
 Marine Corps Air Station Beaufort
 Marine Corps Support Facility Blount Island Command
 Marine Corps Air Station Cherry Point
 Marine Corps Base Camp Lejeune
 Marine Corps Air Station New River

See also

 Marine Corps Installations West
 Marine Corps Installations Pacific
 Marine Corps Installations Command

References

External links
 Marine Corps Installations East

United States Marine Corps organization